George Adam Elliott (June 12, 1875 – November 29, 1944) was an Ontario farmer and political figure. He represented Middlesex North in the House of Commons of Canada as a Conservative member from 1911 to 1917 and in the Legislative Assembly of Ontario from 1923 to 1926 in the provincial riding of Middlesex North.

He was born in Parkhill, Ontario, the son of Andrew Elliott. In 1896, he married Charlotte Poire. Elliot was unsuccessful in bids for reelection to the federal parliament in 1917 and 1921. He served as reeve for West Williams Township, also serving on the local school board.

References 
 Canadian Parliamentary Guide, 1925, EJ Chambers

External links 

1875 births
1944 deaths
Canadian Methodists
Conservative Party of Canada (1867–1942) MPs
Members of the House of Commons of Canada from Ontario
Progressive Conservative Party of Ontario MPPs